Sangram is a Bangladeshi war drama film that was released in 1974. The film was directed by Chashi Nazrul Islam and produced by Kazi Sobuz. Its story is based on true events Khaled Mosharraf wrote in a diary; it depicts the East Bengal Regiment's battles against the Pakistan army and the contribution of Bengali armies to Bangladesh's war of liberation.

Plot
People are marching in the streets of East Pakistan in protests against the country's military junta. At his home, Captain Asad of the Pakistan Army is arguing about the country's future with his sister and her friend. Several days later, Captain Asad and some armies from East Bengal Regiment go to talk with Major Hassan; they learn the Pakistani army has started distrusting Bengali officials. Large numbers of troops are coming from West Pakistan to East Pakistan, which is a sign of danger, and troops of Punjab Regiment are strengthening their area's security system. 

An officer of the Punjab Regiment, on the pretext of the presence of Naxalites, sends a section of the East Bengal Regiment to Shamserganj, far from Chittagong Cantonment, and orders them to remain there. Senior Pakistan Army officials order the return of arms to the Bengali troops. The Bengalis reject this order. Realizing the Pakistanis will soon attack them, the Bengali armies revolt and capture the Punjabi regiment troops. After the declaration of Bangladeshi independence, the war of liberation begins. Pakistani troops detain Captain Asad and a soldier but Asad escapes from the local prison.

Pakistani troops searching for Asad arrive at his house with Razakar Daliluddin and snatch his sister's friend Rikta from his mother. Asad returns home and learns everything from his mother. Asad joins with Major Hassan and they conduct a military operation to liberate his village and rescue the tortured Rikta from Pakistani troops. They win the battle. For nine months Asad fights with the freedom fighters and liberate Bangladesh from Pakistan, undergoing for many hardships.

Cast

Darashiko as Major Hassan
Khosru as Captain Asad
Shuchanda as Mukta, sister of Asad
Nuton as Rikta, friend of Mukta
Hasan Imam as Dr Kabir, a doctor in a camp of freedom fighters
Khalil as a Punjabi officer
ATM Shamsuzzaman as Daliluddin, a razakar
Soldiers from Bangladesh Army
Sheikh Mujibur Rahman ( Bangabandhu) as himself (cameo appearance)

Production
The cast of Sangram includes Bangladeshi veterans of the War of Liberation. In the film's final scene, the Bangladesh Army is honoring Sheikh Mujibur Rahman, the first President of Bangladesh, after the country achieved its independence. The filmmaker wanted to cast Rahman in this scene; he and actor Khasru invited Rahman to act in the film but he rejected their initial offer. Khasru later enlisted the help of Abdul Mannan, who persuaded Rahman to appear in the scene.

Music

Reception

Critical response
According to columnist Bidhan Biberu, some scenes in Sangram present the use of religion by enemy as a tactic during the war. Sangram received positive reviews and acclaim. Alamgir Kabir said about the film; "Except in Ora Egarojon and Sangram, most other films appear to use the phenomenon of war time rape as substitute for similar acts when portrayed in a normal commercial Bengali movie". Alamgir also criticized the film, saying due to a lack of experience, the film fails to present the battle scenes in a realistic way. Film critic Chinmoy Mutsuddi has said the film has a number of inconsistent scenes, which have diminished its appeal. According to columnist Nadir Junaid, the film is not unique but was produced like other, ordinary films.

Accolades

References

Notes

Citations

1974 films
1970s Bengali-language films
Bangladeshi war drama films
Bengali-language Bangladeshi films
Bangladeshi black-and-white films
Films based on diaries
Films about Islam
Films scored by Khandaker Nurul Alam
Films directed by Chashi Nazrul Islam
Films based on the Bangladesh Liberation War
Bangladeshi films based on actual events
Cultural depictions of Sheikh Mujibur Rahman